is a city in the western portion of Tokyo Metropolis, Japan. , the city had an estimated population of 190,403, and a population density of 12,000 persons per km².

Geography
Mitaka is located on the Kantō Plain, just outside the 23 special wards of Tokyo Metropolis, which are on its eastern borders. The Tamagawa Aqueduct canal, which runs alongside Mitaka station, has an important place in history, built in 1653 to feed the local metropolis. It is also the place where novelist Osamu Dazai died by suicide in 1948. The National Astronomical Observatory of Japan is located in Mitaka.

Surrounding municipalities
Tokyo Metropolis
Setagaya
Suginami
Chōfu
Musashino
Koganei

Climate
Mitaka has a Humid subtropical climate (Köppen Cfa) characterized by warm summers and cool winters with light to no snowfall.  The average annual temperature in Mitaka is 14.5 °C. The average annual rainfall is 1647 mm with September as the wettest month. The temperatures are highest on average in August, at around 26.0 °C, and lowest in January, at around 3.1 °C.

Demographics
Per Japanese census data, the population of Musashino increased rapidly in the 1950s and 1960s. In 1994 there were 2,585 foreign residents in Mitaka, including 726 from North and South Korea, 713 from China, 441 from the United States, 114 from the Philippines, and 108 from the United Kingdom. Of all municipalities in Japan, Mitaka had the highest proportion of Chinese returnees.

History
The area of present-day Mitaka was part of ancient Musashi Province. In the post-Meiji Restoration cadastral reform of 22 July 1878, the area became part of Kitatama District in Kanagawa Prefecture. The village of Mitaka was created on 1 April 1889 with the establishment of modern municipalities law. Kitatama District was transferred to the administrative control of Tokyo Metropolis on 1 April 1893. Mitaka was raised to town status in 1940. In 1949, the Mitaka incident, one of a series of unexplained fatal train accidents around the same period of time, occurred at Mitaka Station. Mitaka City was officially founded on 3 November 1950. A motion to merge with neighboring Musashino City failed in 1955 by only a single vote in the Mitaka city assembly.

Government
Mitaka has a mayor-council form of government with a directly elected mayor and a unicameral city council of 28 members. Mitaka contributes two members to the Tokyo Metropolitan Assembly. In terms of national politics, the city is part of Tokyo 22nd district of the lower house of the Diet of Japan.

Economy
Mitaka is primarily a bedroom community for Tokyo. A number of animation studios, including Pierrot and Telecom Animation Film have their corporate headquarters in Mitaka. A short-lived video game manufacturer TAD Corporation was founded and headquartered in the same location. Subaru Tecnica International has its headquarters in Mitaka.

Education

Colleges and universities
 Graduate University for Advanced Studies – Department of Astronomical Science, School of Physical Sciences
 International Christian University – Japan's oldest and largest American-style university, founded on 15 June 1949.
 Japan Lutheran College
 Kyorin University – School of Medicine, Kyorin University Hospital and Nursing School
 Tokyo Union Theological Seminary
 University of Tokyo – the Institute of Astronomy, Faculty of Science; Mitaka International Hall of Residence
Kokugakuin Tochigi Junior College

Primary and secondary schools
Mikata city operates 15 public elementary schools and seven public middle schools. There is also one private elementary school and three private middle schools.
 (東京都立三鷹中等教育学校) is operated by the Tokyo Metropolitan Government Board of Education. There are also four private high schools, including part of the campus of the International Christian University High School.

Private primary and secondary schools:
Taisei High School
Kokugakuin Kugayama Junior High/High School
Hosei University Junior and Senior High School (法政大学中学高等学校)
Musashi International School, formerly Little Angels International School

Public junior high schools:
 No. 1 Junior High School (第一中学校)
 No. 2 Junior High School (第二中学校)
 No. 3 Junior High School (第三中学校)
 No. 4 Junior High School (第四中学校)
 No. 5 Junior High School (第五中学校)
 No. 6 Junior High School (第六中学校)
 No. 7 Junior High School (第七中学校)

Public elementary schools:
 No. 1 (第一小学校)
 No. 2 (第二小学校)
 No. 3 (第三小学校)
 No. 4 (第四小学校)
 No. 5 (第五小学校)
 No. 6 (第六小学校)
 No. 7 (第七小学校)
 Hanesawa (羽沢小学校)
 Higashidai (東台小学校)
 Iguchi (井口小学校)
 Kitano (北野小学校)
 Minamiura (南浦小学校)
 Nakahara (中原小学校)
 Osawadai (大沢台小学校)
 Takayama (高山小学校)

Transportation

Railway
 JR East – Chuo Main Line

 Keio Corporation - Keio Inokashira Line
 –

Highway
   Chūō Expressway

Local attractions

Ghibli Museum
Inokashira Park
Nogawa Park
Yuzo Yamamoto Memorial Museum

Notable people from Mitaka
Ryo Kimura, actor
Yūko Tsushima, author, fiction writer, essayist and critic
Satoshi Ohno, singer, actor, and member of Arashi
Eiji Wentz, singer, actor, entertainer, and member of the singer-songwriter duo WaT
Tsubasa Honda, actress, model
Hiroki Azuma, cultural critic, novelist, and philosopher
Yoshikazu Tanaka, businessman, founder of GREE, Inc.
Masahiro Chono, professional wrestler (originally from Seattle, Washington)

See also
Mitaka incident
Inokashira Park dismemberment incident

References

External links

Mitaka City Official Website 

 
Cities in Tokyo
Western Tokyo
Populated places established in 1950